

Eastern Africa

References

Eastern Africa